Regards from Chuck Pink is an album by American guitarist Leo Kottke, released in 1988.

The song "Busy Signal" is the only song by Leo Kottke nominated for a Grammy award. He did receive another nomination for his soundtrack when "The Paul Bunyan Story", narrated by Jonathan Winters, was nominated.

Reception

Writing for Allmusic, music critic Jim Esch wrote of the album "As a whole, the vibe is somewhat lighter in touch, leaning toward jazz and new age shadings with splashes of synth guitar, violin, and electronic woodwinds for accompaniment... Although Chuck Pink doesn't have the fire in the belly of his earlier work, Kottke hasn't lost his feel for a catchy rhythmic groove and his interpretive reach has grown over the years."

Track listing
 "I Yell at Traffic" – 3:14
 "Foster's Feet" – 4:01
 "Dan's Tune" – 3:19
 "Skinflint" – 2:42
 "Pink Christmas" – 3:00
 "Short Wave" – 2:45
 "Dog Quiver" – 3:36
 "Busy Signal" – 3:52
 "Theme from 'Doodles'" – 2:15
 "The Late Zone" – 4:14
 "Taxco Steps" – 3:14
 "Ojo" – 3:44
 "Mary" – 3:17

All songs by Leo Kottke

Personnel
Leo Kottke - acoustic guitar, electric guitar, synth guitar
George Doering - electric guitar, synth guitar
Ralph Morrison - violin, string arrangements
Brenton Banks - violin
Evan Wilson - viola
Buell Neidlinger - cello, Fender bass, acoustic bass, string arrangements
Peter Erskine - drums, percussion, synth drums, synth program
Jim Keltner - drums, percussion, synth drums, synth program
Marty Krystall - electronic woodwind instrument

Production notes
Produced by Buell Neidlinger
Engineered by Dan Wallin and Sue McLean
Mastered by Stephen Marcussen
Photography by Tom Berthiaume

References

External links
 Leo Kottke official site
 Unofficial Leo Kottke web site (fan site)

1988 albums
Leo Kottke albums
Private Music albums